Cobalt tris(diethyldithiocarbamate) is the coordination complex of cobalt with diethyldithiocarbamate with the formula Co(S2CNEt2)3 (Et = ethyl). It is a diamagnetic green solid that is soluble in organic solvents.

Synthesis, structure, bonding
Cobalt tris(dithiocarbamate)s are typically are prepared by air-oxidation of mixtures of dithiocarbamate salts and a cobalt(II) nitrate. Cobalt tris(diethyldithiocarbamate) is an octahedral coordination complex of low-spin Co(III) with idealized D3 symmetry. The Co-S distances are 267 pm.

Reactions
Oxidation of Co(Et2dtc)3 occurs at mild potentials to give the cobalt(IV) derivative.

Treatment of Co(Et2dtc)3 with fluoroboric acid results in the removal of 0.5 equiv of ligand giving a binuclear cation:
2Co(Et2dtc)3  +  HBF4  →  [Co2(Et2dtc)5]BF4  +  "Et2NdtcH"

See also
 Iron tris(diethyldithiocarbamate) - a related dimethyldithiocarbamate complex of iron

References

Fungicides
Dithiocarbamates
Cobalt complexes